Goshen Township may refer to:

Arkansas
 Goshen Township, Washington County, Arkansas

Illinois
 Goshen Township, Stark County, Illinois

Iowa
 Goshen Township, Muscatine County, Iowa

Kansas
 Goshen Township, Clay County, Kansas

Ohio
Goshen Township, Auglaize County, Ohio
Goshen Township, Belmont County, Ohio
Goshen Township, Champaign County, Ohio
Goshen Township, Clermont County, Ohio
Goshen Township, Hardin County, Ohio
Goshen Township, Mahoning County, Ohio
Goshen Township, Tuscarawas County, Ohio

Pennsylvania
 Goshen Township, Clearfield County, Pennsylvania

See also
 West Goshen Township, Chester County, Pennsylvania
 East Goshen Township, Chester County, Pennsylvania

Township name disambiguation pages